Nas is a small village on the Greek island of Icaria.
It is famous for the beach which is located near the ruins of an ancient temple dedicated to the goddess Artemis.

Icaria